Carlos Alberto "Piscis" Restrepo Isaza (born 5 March 1961) is a Colombian football coach, currently in charge of Jaguares de Córdoba.

Career
Never having the opportunity of playing the sport professionally because of an injury, he began his coaching career at his early 20s. After some time spent managing in minor leagues and regional teams in his home country, he took over several U-17 and U-20 Colombia national football teams. He then began coaching teams such as Once Caldas, Independiente Medellín, Atlético Junior, Deportes Quindío and Deportes Tolima. He won the first division tournament of Fútbol Profesional Colombiano in 1995 with Atlético Junior.

He then went on to manage Deportivo Táchira of the Primera División Venezolana, or Venezuelan Professional Football League. He arrived to Costa Rica in 2002, and coached Municipal Pérez Zeledón for three years, where he won the Apertura Championship of Costa Rica's first division in 2004, against all odds. In 2005, he was signed by Brujas where he was able to build a very competitive team and battled to win the Costa Rica's first division title.

In 2013, he managed Colombia U-20 team to win their third South American Youth Championship.
In 2017, he was named coach for Olimpia after Hector Vargas was fired.

In 2019, he was named coach for Real España. After that, in 2020 he was named coach of AD San Carlos in Costa Rican first division.

Managerial statistics
Statistics accurate as of 12 June 2017

Honors
Junior
Categoría Primera A (1): 1995

Olimpia
Liga Nacional (1): 2009 Clausura

Pérez Zeledón
Primera División (1): 2004 Apertura

References

1961 births
Living people
Colombian football managers
Once Caldas managers
Deportes Tolima managers
Independiente Medellín managers
Atlético Junior managers
L.D. Alajuelense managers
Expatriate football managers in Costa Rica
C.D. Olimpia managers
Puntarenas F.C. managers
Colombia national under-20 football team managers
Deportivo Pereira managers
Jaguares de Córdoba managers
Deportivo Pasto managers